Right Reverend William Lanigan (May 1820 – 13 June 1900), was a Roman Catholic Bishop of Goulburn, New South Wales.

Lanigan was born in Tipperary, Ireland, the son of Thomas Lanigan and his wife Brigid Anastasia, née Dauton. He was educated at Thurles and Maynooth Colleges. He was ordained priest at Maynooth on 8 April 1848, and emigrated to Sydney in 1859. After seven years' missionary work in Goulburn and Berrima, he was consecrated Bishop of Goulburn on 9 June 1867.

References

19th-century Irish Roman Catholic priests
19th-century Roman Catholic bishops in Australia
Alumni of St. Patrick's College, Thurles
Alumni of St Patrick's College, Maynooth
1820 births
1900 deaths
Roman Catholic bishops of Goulburn